The Game Developers Choice Award for the Game of the Year, also known as GDCA Game of the Year is the main video game award presented at the Game Developers Conference (GDC), the largest annual gathering of professional video game developers. The conference, usually held in or around March in San Francisco, presents the award as part of the Game Developers Choice Awards (GDCA), a series of awards honoring outstanding achievements in video game design for games released during the previous calendar year. It has been awarded since 2001.

Only four studios have won the award more than once:
Valve, for Half-Life 2 (2004) and Portal (2007)
Bethesda Game Studios, for Fallout 3 (2008) and The Elder Scrolls V: Skyrim (2011)
Naughty Dog, for Uncharted 2: Among Thieves (2009) and The Last of Us (2013)
Rockstar Games, for Grand Theft Auto III (2001) and Red Dead Redemption (2010)

The most successful video game publisher to date is Sony Interactive Entertainment with 13 nominations and 4 wins, followed by Nintendo (11 nominations, 1 win), Electronic Arts (8 nominations and 1 win) and Rockstar Games (7 nominations and 2 wins). Indie games have won the award 4 times Journey (published by Sony Interactive Entertainment) in 2012, Untitled Goose Game in 2019, Hades in 2020, and Inscryption in 2021.

List of winners

2000s
Note: From 2005 to 2007 the award was titled Best Game. Years listed represent calendar years for which the awards were given. Ceremonies are usually held in March the following year.

2010s

2020s

References 

Video game lists by reception or rating
Awards established in 2001
Game Developers Choice Awards
Awards for best video game